Miss São Tomé and Príncipe was established in 2014.

Miss World
Color key

Miss Supranational
Color key

See also
Miss World

São Tomé and Príncipe